The 1886 American Cup was the second installment of the soccer tournament directed by the American Football Association. Clark ONT, as holders of the trophy, had successfully defended their title and receiving along with the trophy a pair of leg guards donated by the Alma Cricket and Football club.

Participants
The clubs still all came from New York and New Jersey, though there were now four different cities represented. The Domestic club became the Almas, while New York Rovers and Trenton were added. The Alma football club, established in 1884, played out of Frelinghuysen Avenue Grounds and wore black jerseys and white knickerbockers. The Trenton football club, established in 1886, played out of the East State Street grounds and wore blue and black jerseys, blue caps, white shorts, and red socks.
New York- Rovers and New York F.B.C.
Trenton- Trenton F.B.C.
Paterson- Caledonian Thistle Club
Newark- Clark O.N.T., Almas, and Kearny Rangers.

First round

Trenton- E.H.Openshaw(c), J.James, J.Mart, H.Everingham, T.Baddely, D.Baggley, J.Mardel, W.Emery, T.McNichol, Frank Gee, R.Rhodes. Kearny Rangers: GK D.Ferguson, DF J.Hood, J.Lennox, MF T.Burke, W.Hood, D.Morris, FW R.Raeburn, W.Taylor, J.Young, J.Taylor, H.Ashley.

O.N.T.: GK R.Hughes, DF Harry Holden, J.Dougherty, MF T.Smith, Joe Swithemby, A.Polisher, FW C.McCann, James Howarth, Jack Swithemby, James McGurck, Joseph Swarbrick. Rovers: GK W.Donnegan, DF A.Crawford, W.Dunnan, J.Lachlan, MF W.Lachlan, B.Wilson, H.Westbrook, FW J.White, F.Malcomb, W.Harris, A.Campbell.

Almas: GK Hollenback FB Starmer, Moore, HB Frank Farrow, Morton, Corbey, FW Lucas, Lodge, Maxfield, John Gray, George Curtin.

First replay

Second replay

Second round

ONT: GK Hughes, DF Pollister, Holden, MF Howarth, Joe Swithenby, P.Smith, FW Swarbrick, McGurck, McCann, Devine, Jack Swithenby(c). Thistles: T.Paterson, Chapman, Hall, Williamson, Forsythe, W.Turner(c), Anderson, A.Turner, Donaldson, H.Craig, J.Kane.

 
Almas: GK Ryker, DF Moore, Conklin, MF Corby, Morton, Hirst, FW Gray, Lucas, Lodge, Curtin, Maxfield.
Rangers: GK T.Hood, DF J.Hood, Lennox, MF Buck, W.Hood, Crawford, FW Ashley, William Taylor, Walter Taylor, Raeburn, J.Young.

Final round

American Cup Bracket
Home teams listed on top of bracket

(*): result after two replays

Champions

References

Sources
National Police Gazette
New York Herald
New York Sun
Spirit of the Times
Morning Register
Daily Advertiser
Evening News
Sunday Call

1886
1886 in association football
1886 in American sports